Lukhovitsy is a town and the administrative center of Lukhovitsky District in Moscow Oblast, Russia, located on the Oka River  southeast of Moscow. Population:

History
It was first mentioned in 1594 as the settlement of Glukhovichi, a votchina of a Ryazan archbishop. It used to be called Lukhovichi until the mid-1920s. In 1957, it was granted town status. The town grew rapidly after the transfer of testing (and later production) facilities of the Mikoyan design bureau.

Administrative and municipal status
Within the framework of administrative divisions, Lukhovitsy serves as the administrative center of Lukhovitsky District. As an administrative division, it is, together with the settlement of stantsii Chernaya, incorporated within Lukhovitsky District as the Town of Lukhovitsy. As a municipal division, the Town of Lukhovitsy is incorporated within Lukhovitsky Municipal District as Lukhovitsy Urban Settlement.

Transportation
The town is served by the Tretyakovo Airport. A bus terminal is located here.

Trivia
Lukhovitsy is famous for growing cucumbers; there is a monument of a cucumber in the town.

References

Notes

Sources

Cities and towns in Moscow Oblast
Zaraysky Uyezd